Jeff Skiba (born April 28, 1984) is a police officer and a Paralympic athlete from the United States competing mainly in category P44 pentathlon events.

Jeff competed in the 2008 Summer Paralympics in Beijing, China.  There he won a gold medal in the men's high jump - P44 event, a silver medal in the men's pentathlon - P44 event, finished fifth in the men's javelin - F42/44 event, finished sixth in the men's discus throw - F44 event and finished ninth in the men's Long jump - F42/44 event

Major Achievements
2008: Gold medal, F44/F46 High Jump; silver medal, P44 Pentathlon - Paralympic Games, Beijing, China
2008: Unofficial world record, high jump (2.15m) - Asuza Pacific Invitational, Los Angeles, Calif.
2007: World record, high jump (2.10m) - U.S. Paralympics Track and Field National Championships, Atlanta, Ga.
2007: First Paralympic athlete to compete at U.S. Indoor Track and Field National Championships
2006: Gold medal, high jump; Fourth place, long jump - IPC World Championships, Assen, The Netherlands
2006: Gold medal, pentathlon -U.S. Paralympics Track & Field National Championships, Atlanta, Ga.
2004: Silver medal, high jump -Paralympic Games, Athens, Greece
2002: Gold medal, high jump - IPC Athletics World Championships, Lille, France
2002: First place, high jump - International Challenge Track and Field Meet
2002: First place, high jump - Washington State High School Track & Field Championships

References

External links
 

1984 births
Living people
Paralympic track and field athletes of the United States
Paralympic gold medalists for the United States
American pentathletes
American male high jumpers
American male discus throwers
American male javelin throwers
American male long jumpers
American amputees
American police officers
Track and field athletes from Seattle
Medalists at the 2004 Summer Paralympics
Medalists at the 2008 Summer Paralympics
Medalists at the 2012 Summer Paralympics
Paralympic silver medalists for the United States
Athletes (track and field) at the 2004 Summer Paralympics
Athletes (track and field) at the 2008 Summer Paralympics
Athletes (track and field) at the 2012 Summer Paralympics
Athletes (track and field) at the 2016 Summer Paralympics
Paralympic medalists in athletics (track and field)
Medalists at the 2015 Parapan American Games
People from Sammamish, Washington
University of Phoenix alumni